World Extreme Cagefighting (WEC) was an American mixed martial arts (MMA) promotion founded in 2001. It was purchased by Zuffa, LLC, the parent company of the Ultimate Fighting Championship (UFC), in 2006. The smaller cage is now used by UFC for selected events.

History
Scott Adams and Reed Harris started the organization in 2001. Between 2001 and 2006, most of their events were held at Tachi Palace Hotel & Casino in Lemoore, California, and aired on HDNet.
In December 2006, Zuffa purchased WEC. With the purchase, WEC continued as a separate promotion with its own roster of fighters. Adams was retained after the purchase as the organization's matchmaker. Harris and Adams were named co-General Managers and were both active in the new WEC. In 2008, Sean Shelby was named the new match-maker for the promotion by Zuffa.

Zuffa made several changes to the promotion after the purchase. It discontinued its pentagonal cage for a modified version of the UFC's octagonal cage, with a 25-foot diameter instead of the UFC's 30-foot diameter cage. The championships of fighters who were contracted UFC fighters were vacated. The promotion moved to focus on lighter weight classes, abandoning their heavyweight and super heavyweight divisions and championships, and retaining their bantamweight and featherweight divisions—two divisions not then present in the UFC. After the purchase, several WEC events were held in Zuffa's hometown of Las Vegas, Nevada, much like the UFC.

WEC aired their events live on Versus (formerly known as the Outdoor Life Network and now as the NBC Sports Network) in the United States and on TSN (and later The Score) in Canada. WEC's first live event was broadcast on June 3, 2007, on Versus from The Joint at the Hard Rock Hotel and Casino in Las Vegas.

Todd Harris was the play by play announcer on every televised WEC event on Versus, and was joined by former UFC Heavyweight Champion Frank Mir on color commentary until the spring of 2010, when Mir was replaced by UFC light heavyweight Stephan Bonnar. Fellow Zuffa fighters Kenny Florian and Jens Pulver have also filled in on color commentary due to Mir or Bonnar's absences. UFC announcers Mike Goldberg and Joe Rogan called WEC's only pay-per-view event, WEC 48 in April 2010. Postfight interviews on the Versus-televised cards were typically done by either Harris or Versus sportscaster Craig Hummer.

Joe Martinez served as the announcer for Zuffa-promoted WEC events until April 2010, when he left the organization and was replaced by UFC announcer Bruce Buffer. However, Martinez made a one-off return at WEC 52 that November when Buffer was overseas for a UFC event.

WEC announced that it would dissolve their light heavyweight and middleweight divisions after their December 3, 2008 event to further their concentration on lighter classes. Fighters from the light heavyweight and middleweight divisions started fighting in the UFC after the dissolution of their divisions. Also, on February 3, 2009, WEC officially announced the creation of a  flyweight division and the dissolution of its welterweight division (flyweight would have been the last division under the "Unified Rules of MMA" to be activated under Zuffa, excluding Super Heavyweight).  Fighters from the welterweight division started fighting in the UFC after the dissolution of their division. The only weight class that still crossed over between WEC and the UFC prior to the merger was the  lightweight division.

On January 8, 2010, World Extreme Cagefighting announced that Amp Energy would be the official energy drink of WEC.  Amp Energy also sponsored three of WEC's top stars - featherweight Urijah Faber, featherweight Chad Mendes, and bantamweight Joseph Benavidez.

On April 24, 2010, WEC held its only pay-per-view event, WEC 48, which featured two championship fights. The main event featured WEC Featherweight Champion José Aldo defending his title against former champion Urijah Faber.

On October 28, 2010, UFC President Dana White announced that WEC would merge with the UFC.

Relationship with the UFC
Due to its shared ownership under Zuffa, fans and commentators had continually speculated about a unification between WEC and the UFC, particularly the lower weight classes. The relationship between the WEC and UFC had also been complicated by their respective primary partnerships with cable television channels, Versus and Spike, Fight Magazine reported.
On October 28, 2010, Dana White announced the merger with the UFC.

Media coverage
On December 11, 2006, UFC parent-company, Zuffa, formalized plans to buy World Extreme Cagefighting, to be run as a separate promotion from the UFC. Following the purchase of WEC, Zuffa made several changes to the promotion. One of the most noteworthy changes included added media exposure when WEC signed a deal to air events on Versus beginning with WEC 28. Prior to this WEC had broadcast most of their events on HDNet.

While on Versus, most events aired mid-week, or on Sunday nights during the summer months. WEC drew good ratings that averaged around 575,000 average viewers per event. However ratings ranged from 245,000 to 1,500,000.

The biggest ratings draw for WEC was Urijah Faber. When Faber was featured in the main event he drew an average of 840,000 viewers. Faber was also featured in both main events (34 and 41) that drew over a million viewers for WEC.

The following table shows the international broadcasting of WEC events:

See also
List of WEC events
List of WEC champions
List of WEC bonus award recipients

References

External links
 Official website

 
Mixed martial arts organizations
Ultimate Fighting Championship
2001 establishments in the United States
Sports organizations established in 2001
2010 disestablishments in the United States
Organizations disestablished in 2010
Defunct brands
Defunct companies